BBD may stand for:

Music
Bell Biv DeVoe or BBD, a music group
BBD (album), an album by Bell Biv DeVoe
"B.B.D. (I Thought It Was Me)?", a song by Bell Biv Devoe from Poison
B.B.D. (The Poison Tour)
Be-Bop Deluxe, a rock band
Big Black Delta, an electronic music project by Jonathan Bates
"BBD" (song), a song by Azealia Banks

Other uses
B. B. D. Bagh, a business district in Kolkata
B.B.D. Bag railway station
Beech bark disease, a tree pathogen
Big black dog, a type of mixed-breed subject to black-dog bias
Birmingham Blitz Dames, an English roller derby team
Bucket-brigade device, an analogue delay line in electronics
Banco Bradesco, NYSE ticker symbol
Bombardier Inc., Toronto Stock Exchange symbol
Barbadian dollar, by ISO 4217 code